Semen Vitaliyovych Vovchenko (born 13 June 1999) is a Ukrainian professional footballer who plays as a centre-back for Ukrainian club Veres Rivne.

Career
In 2020 he moved to Nyva Ternopil and in August 2022 he moved to Veres Rivne.

References

External links
 
 

1999 births
Living people
Footballers from Zaporizhzhia
Ukrainian footballers
Association football defenders
FC Zorya Luhansk players
FC Nyva Ternopil players
Ukrainian First League players